Płomyk. Tygodnik ilustrowany dla dzieci i młodzieży ('Flame. Illustrated Weekly for children and teenagers') was a Polish children and teen magazine published from 1917 to 1991.

It was founded by Janina Porazińska and continued in the Second Polish Republic. Re-established in the Polish People's Republic after World War II, it was closed after the fall of communism due to losses and  unprofitability.

During its history, its contributors included some of the top Polish authors for children and teenagers, such as Edmund Niziurski and Zbigniew Nienacki.

See also
Płomyczek

References

1917 establishments in Poland
1991 disestablishments in Poland
Defunct magazines published in Poland
Magazines established in 1917
Magazines disestablished in 1991
Children's magazines published in Poland
Polish-language magazines
Teen magazines